is a Japanese actress, singer, and model. She is represented by Humanitè.

Biography
She initially joined Laugh and Peace as a vocalist, and debuted in January 1999 with the single "Chotto kī te na". She is also active as a model in fashion magazines such as Seda and soup.  Her first starring role in a film was on Inuneko, produced in 2004 and co-starring Kanako Enomoto.

In 2005, she married theatre director Noda Hideki.

Filmography

Advertisements

TV programmes

Radio programmes

Music videos

Discography

Singles

Albums

Video game music

Video game soundtracks

References

External links
  
 Yoko Fujita – allcinema 
 
 

Japanese actresses
Actors from Nara Prefecture
1980 births
Living people